Hasanaginica, also Asanaginica, (first published as The Mourning Song of the Noble Wife of the Hasan Aga) is a South Slavic folk ballad, created during the period of 1646–49, in the region of Imotski, which at the time was a part of the Bosnia Eyalet of the Ottoman Empire.

Publication history
The ballad was transmitted for years in oral form until it was written and published in 1774 by Italian traveler and ethnographer Alberto Fortis in his book Viaggio in Dalmazia ("Journey to Dalmatia") after his travel through Dalmatia in 1770. During his travels, he discovered what he called a "Morlach ballad", the Morlachs being a people from the region. Fortis's book was criticised by Croatian writer Ivan Lovrić, who accused Fortis of many factual errors in his response, Notes on 'Travels in Dalmatia' of Abbe Alberto Fortis, which he then attempted to rectify.

It appeared with Goethe's signature in his eight edition of collected works (1789).

Walter Scott was the second foreign author to translate Hasanaginica in 1798 under the title "Lamentation of the Faithful Wife of Asan Aga", from the German of Goethe. Other British translators soon followed the suit, including Sir John Bowring, James Clarence Mangan, W. Edmondstone Aytoun, Edgar Alfred Bowring, Mary Ann Burt, George Bancroft, Owen Meredith, Edward Chawner, William Gibson, Maximilian A. Mügge.

It was translated into Russian (Pushkin, 1835, a beginning part, and Akhmatova, 1950s, in full), French (Mérimée, 1827 and Mickiewicz, 1841), and other languages, becoming an integral part of the world literary heritage already in the 18th century. Eventually Hasanaginica has been translated into more than 40 languages. It is considered a part of the shared Serbo-Croatian (Bosnian, Croatian and Serbian) literary heritage.

Setting and plot

Hasanaginica, "The Mourning Song of the Noble Wife of the Hasan Aga" is a ballad about the Muslim family Arapović in Dalmatia. The incidents take place along the Province of Bosnia's frontier in Vrdol (today Zagvozd), near the Biokovo mountains of Dalmatia, where the lord (aga) Hasan Arapović had large estates. The ruins of the Hasan's towers exist today, as well as the place where Hasanaginica is presumed to be buried, near the ruins, on the southwestern slopes of the Blue Lake.

The ballad relates that following a battle, whilst lying wounded, Hasan-aga summons his wife, Fatima, who was unwilling to accompany him to the battlefield. Deeply angered and in pain, Hasan-aga sends his wife a message ordering her to leave his castle without their children. Despite pleading with her brother, who brings her the message and the divorce papers, Hasan-aga's wife is ousted from her home and her brother arranges her to be married to a wealthy kadı. As a last wish before the marriage, she asks her brother for a long veil so that she does not see her children as the wedding procession passes by her old castle. Ultimately, her children see her and call out for her. As she stops to bid them farewell one last time, she dies of sorrow.

Linguistic and historical background
The poem's language is Serbo-Croatian, termed by Fortis as "Illyrian" (meaning South Slavic). The version published by Fortis was probably copied from an ikavian text and changed in accordance with the style of language spoken in Dubrovnik. It combines mostly jekavian and some ikavian forms, and includes misspellings. Serbian philologist and linguist Vuk Karadžić (1787–1864), who never actually heard the poem sung by a folk singer, changed Fortis's transcription to create a more Serbian version which would reflect his codification of the language.

The meter of the ballad is classical South Slavic decasyllable or 10-syllable verse, translated by Goethe as trochaic pentameter.

There is much debate about whether the ballad was purely poetical and fictional, or based on real people and events. However, the following people did actually exist and are believed to be the basis of the ballad:

Hasan-aga Arapović – An Ottoman aga and Ottoman Bosnian frontiersman
Fatima Arapović (née Pintorović) – Hasan-aga's wife
Pintorović-beg – An Ottoman bey and Fatima's brother

As concluded by Bosnian writer Alija Isaković (1932–1997) in his 1975 monograph, the poem originated in the Imotski frontier. This area was known as Morlachia during the 15th century. Hasan-aga held courts in Vrdovo (today's Zagvozd) and Župa (villages on the Biokovo northern slopes), and belonged to the Arapović clan, whose descendants still live in Ljubuški, Bosnia and Herzegovina.

Legacy

Adaptations
Hasanaginica was the only authentic ballad included into La Guzla,  an 1827 literary hoax of Prosper Mérimée.

A  movie entitled Hasanaginica was made in 1967 starring Milena Dravić and Rade Marković. This was followed in 1983 by a Yugoslav television movie featuring Žarko Laušević and Aleksandra Nikolić.

In 2000, an opera based on Hasanaginica premiered at the National Theatre of Sarajevo and was later released on CD. The libretto was written by Nijaz Alispahić and the composer was Asim Horozić. 

Hasanaginica by TV Sarajevo was a  TV film with Nada Đurevska in the title role, Josip Pejaković as Hasan Aga and Miralem Zupčević as Beg Pintorović.

In 2006, Hasanaginica premiered at the Croatian National Theatre in Zagreb. Mustafa Nadarević directed and played the lead role while Ljupco Konstantinov composed it. 

In 2009, Hasanaginica premiered at the Serbian National Theatre. It was directed by Ivana Dragutinović Maričić, conducted by Mladen Jagušt, and composed by Rastislav Kambasković.

References

Sources

Ballads
Bosnia and Herzegovina literature
Bosnia and Herzegovina folklore
Croatian literature
Croatian folklore